The Durango Riot is an English- singing Swedish rock band.
They have created three albums: Telemission (2007), Backwards over Midnight (2012), and Face (2014).

References

Swedish rock music groups
Swedish hard rock musical groups